Jacques Tits (12 August 1930 – 5 December 2021) was a Belgian-born French mathematician who worked on group theory and incidence geometry. He introduced Tits buildings, the Tits alternative, the Tits group, and the Tits metric.

Life and career 
Tits was born in Uccle to Léon Tits, a professor, and Lousia André. Jacques attended the Athénée of Uccle and the Free University of Brussels. His thesis advisor was Paul Libois, and Tits graduated with his doctorate in 1950 with the dissertation Généralisation des groupes projectifs basés sur la notion de transitivité. His academic career includes professorships at the Free University of Brussels (now split into the Université Libre de Bruxelles and the Vrije Universiteit Brussel) (1962–1964), the University of Bonn (1964–1974) and the Collège de France in Paris, until becoming emeritus in 2000. He changed his citizenship to French in 1974 in order to teach at the Collège de France, which at that point required French citizenship. Because Belgian nationality law did not allow dual nationality at the time, he renounced his Belgian citizenship. He has been a member of the French Academy of Sciences since 1979.

Tits was an "honorary" member of the Nicolas Bourbaki group; as such, he helped popularize H.S.M. Coxeter's work, introducing terms such as Coxeter number, Coxeter group, and Coxeter graph.

Honors 
Tits received the Wolf Prize in Mathematics in 1993, the Cantor Medal from the Deutsche Mathematiker-Vereinigung (German Mathematical Society) in 1996, and the German distinction "Pour le Mérite".  In 2008 he was awarded the Abel Prize, along with John Griggs Thompson, "for their profound achievements in algebra and in particular for shaping modern group theory". He was a member of several Academies of Sciences.

He was a member of the Norwegian Academy of Science and Letters. He became a foreign member of the Royal Netherlands Academy of Arts and Sciences in 1988.

Death 
Tits died on 5 December 2021, at the age of 91 in the 13th arrondissement, Paris.

Contributions 
He introduced the theory of buildings (sometimes known as Tits buildings), which are combinatorial structures on which groups act, particularly in algebraic group theory (including finite groups, and groups defined over the p-adic numbers). The related theory of (B, N) pairs is a basic tool in the theory of groups of Lie type. Of particular importance is his classification of all irreducible buildings of spherical type and rank at least three, which involved classifying all polar spaces of rank at least three. The existence of these buildings initially depended on the existence of a group of Lie type in each case, but in joint work with Mark Ronan he constructed those of rank at least four independently, yielding the groups directly. In the rank-2 case spherical building are generalized n-gons, and in joint work with Richard Weiss he classified these when they admit a suitable group of symmetries (the so-called Moufang polygons). In collaboration with François Bruhat he developed the theory of affine buildings, and later he classified all irreducible buildings of affine type and rank at least four.

Another of his well-known theorems is the "Tits alternative":  if G is a finitely generated subgroup of a linear group, then either G has a solvable subgroup of finite index or it has a free subgroup of rank 2.

The Tits group and the Kantor–Koecher–Tits construction are named after him. He introduced the Kneser–Tits conjecture.

Publications 

J. Tits, Oeuvres - Collected Works, 4 vol., Europ. Math. Soc., 2013. J. Tits, Résumés des cours au Collège de France, S.M.F., Doc.Math. 12, 2013.

References

External links 
 
 
 Biography at the Abel Prize site  (pdf)
 List of publications at the Université libre de Bruxelles
 

1930 births
2021 deaths
People from Uccle
20th-century French mathematicians
21st-century French mathematicians
Abel Prize laureates
Belgian expatriates in France
Belgian mathematicians
Academic staff of the Collège de France
Free University of Brussels (1834–1969) alumni
Group theorists
Members of the French Academy of Sciences
Members of the Norwegian Academy of Science and Letters
Members of the Royal Netherlands Academy of Arts and Sciences
Foreign associates of the National Academy of Sciences
Recipients of the Pour le Mérite (civil class)
Nicolas Bourbaki
Officers of the Ordre national du Mérite
Academic staff of the University of Bonn
Wolf Prize in Mathematics laureates
Academic staff of the Free University of Brussels (1834–1969)